Elections to Tameside Council were held on 6 May 2010. One- third of the council was up for election, with each successful candidate to serve a four-year term of office, expiring in 2014. The Labour Party retained overall control of the council.

Results

Ashton Hurst ward

Ashton St. Michael's ward

Ashton Waterloo ward

Audenshaw ward

Denton North East ward

Denton South ward

Denton West ward

Droylsden East ward

Droylsden West ward

Dukinfield ward

Dukinfield / Stalybridge ward

Hyde Godley ward

Hyde Newton ward

Hyde Werneth ward

Longdendale ward 
Councillor Roy Oldham died later the same year. The seat was retained for Labour by Janet Cooper in a by-election on 30 September 2010.

Mossley ward

St. Peters ward

Stalybridge North ward

Stalybridge South ward

References

2010 English local elections
2010
2010s in Greater Manchester